The All-Ireland Junior Ladies' Football Championship  is a "knockout" competition in the game of Ladies' Gaelic football played by women in Ireland. The series of games are organised by  Ladies' Gaelic Football Association (Irish :Cumann Peil Gael na mBan) and are played during the summer months with the All-Ireland Final being played on the last Sunday in September or the first Sunday in October in Croke Park, Dublin. The winners of the competition are presented with the West County Hotel Cup.

Roll of honour

Notes
 (after a replay) - LGFA president Pat Quill promised to provide part of the money required for the New York team's third visit to Ireland that year after the final finished level

Winners Table

References

Outside Sources
 Ladies Gaelic Roll of Honour

Junior Ladies' Football Championship
Ladies' Gaelic football competitions